HSwMS Delfinen (De), was the fourth boat of the Draken-class submarine of the Swedish Navy.

Construction and career 
HSwMS Delfinen was launched on 7 March 1961 by Saab Kockums, Malmö and commissioned on 7 June 1962.

She was decommissioned in 1989 and scrapped later in Gävle in 1993.

Gallery

References 

Draken-class submarines
Ships built in Malmö
1961 ships